Ohlone typically refers to the Ohlone people.

Ohlone may also refer to:

Ohlone languages
Ohlone mythology
Ohlone/Chynoweth (VTA), light rail route
Ohlone/Chynoweth–Almaden (VTA), light rail route
Ohlone College, a community college located in Fremont, California 
Ohlone Greenway, a pedestrian and bicycle path in the East Bay region of the San Francisco Bay Area
Ohlone manzanita, Arctostaphylos ohloneana
Ohlone Wilderness, a regional part in California
Ohlone tiger beetle